Belknap Hill (also called Lookout Hill), is a prominent river bluff directly northeast of downtown Grand Rapids, Michigan. The hill is a distinct topographical feature when viewed from the Western approach to the downtown area. Evening romancers and view seekers throughout the history of Grand Rapids have favored its two hillside city parks. Belknap Hill holds a nostalgic place in the sentiments of Grand Rapidians in that it has long been a popular place to propose marriage.  Hidden in the backwaters of the semi-isolated Belknap Lookout neighborhood atop this hill remain some of the simple nineteenth century framed homes from days when Belknap Hill bordered small farms and apple orchards. A cherished historic feature of the hill is the steeply inclined Trowbridge and North Street which are the city's Two fieldstone cobblestoned streets.

See also 

Landforms of Michigan
Geography of Grand Rapids, Michigan
Cliffs of the United States
Landforms of Kent County, Michigan